This is a list of films produced by the Ollywood film industry based in Bhubaneshwar and Cuttack in 1966:

A-Z

References

1966
Ollywood
Films, Ollywood
1960s in Orissa